M-144 was the designation given to two former state trunkline highways in the U.S. state of Michigan:

M-144 (1937–1939 Michigan highway) in East Lansing
M-144 (1940–1973 Michigan highway) between Roscommon and Luzerne